Longitarsus suturellus is a species of beetle in the subfamily Galerucinae. It is distributed in the Palearctic realm from the Pyrenees to Japan. Adult beetles and larvae feed on the leaves of sage (Senecio) (Asteraceae).

Forms and varieties
Variety: Longitarsus suturellus var. paludosus (Weise, 1893)
Variety: Longitarsus suturellus var. macer (Weise, 1895)
Form: Longitarsus suturellus f. limbalis (Kolbe, 1920)
Form: Longitarsus suturellus f. testis (Kolbe, 1920)

References

S
Beetles described in 1825
Beetles of Asia
Taxa named by Caspar Erasmus Duftschmid